Helen's Bay railway station serves Helen's Bay in the townland of Ballygrot, County Down, Northern Ireland.

The station in the grand Scottish Baronial style, built in 1863, was the creation of Lord Dufferin, through whose land the line was laid. His family had their own private entrance and waiting room. The architect was Benjamin Ferrey.

The next station on the line towards Bangor used to be Crawfordsburn, but this was closed in 1997.

Service
Extra services operate at peak times, and the service reduces to hourly operation in the evenings. Certain peak-time express trains will pass through Helen's Bay station without stopping.

On Sundays there is an hourly service in each direction.

References

Bibliography
William Alan McCutcheon, The Industrial Archaeology of Northern Ireland, (Department of the Environment for Northern Ireland 1980)

Railway stations in County Down
Scottish baronial architecture
Railway stations opened in 1865
Railway stations served by NI Railways
Grade A listed buildings
Railway stations in Northern Ireland opened in the 19th century